In biology, an organism is any living system that functions as an individual entity. All organisms are composed of cells (cell theory). The idea of organism is based on the concept of minimal functional unit of life. Three traits have been proposed to play the main role in qualification as an organism:

 noncompartmentability – structure that cannot be divided without its functionality loss,
 individuality – the entity has simultaneous holding of genetic uniqueness, genetic homogeneity and autonomy,
 distinctness – genetic information has to maintain open-system (a cell).

Organisms are classified by taxonomy into groups such as multicellular animals, plants, and fungi; or unicellular microorganisms such as protists, bacteria, and archaea. All types of organisms are capable of reproduction, growth and development, maintenance, and some degree of response to stimuli. Beetles, squids, tetrapods, mushrooms, and vascular plants are examples of multicellular organisms that differentiate specialized tissues and organs during development.

A unicellular organism may be either a prokaryote or a eukaryote. Prokaryotes are represented by two separate domains – bacteria and archaea. Eukaryotic organisms are characterized by the presence of a membrane-bound cell nucleus and contain additional membrane-bound compartments called organelles (such as mitochondria in animals and plants and plastids in plants and algae, all generally considered to be derived from endosymbiotic bacteria). Fungi, animals and plants are examples of kingdoms of organisms within the eukaryotes.

Estimates on the number of Earth's current species range from 2 million to 1 trillion, of which over 1.7 million have been documented. More than 99% of all species, amounting to over five billion species, that ever lived are estimated to be extinct.

In 2016, a set of 355 genes from the last universal common ancestor (LUCA) of all organisms from Earth was identified.

Etymology
The term "organism" (from Greek ὀργανισμός, organismos, from ὄργανον, organon, i.e. "instrument, implement, tool, organ of sense or apprehension") first appeared in the English language in 1703 and took on its current definition by 1834 (Oxford English Dictionary). It is directly related to the term "organization". There is a long tradition of defining organisms as self-organizing beings, going back at least to Immanuel Kant's 1790 Critique of Judgment.

Definitions
An organism may be defined as an assembly of molecules functioning as a more or less stable whole that exhibits the properties of life. Dictionary definitions can be broad, using phrases such as "any living structure, such as a plant, animal, fungus or bacterium, capable of growth and reproduction". Many definitions exclude viruses and possible man-made non-organic life forms, as viruses are dependent on the biochemical machinery of a host cell for reproduction. A superorganism is an organism consisting of many individuals working together as a single functional or social unit.

There has been controversy about the best way to define the organism and indeed about whether or not such a definition is necessary. Several contributions are responses to the suggestion that the category of "organism" may well not be adequate in biology.

Viruses

Viruses are not typically considered to be organisms because they are incapable of autonomous reproduction, growth or metabolism. Although some organisms are also incapable of independent survival and live as obligatory intracellular parasites, they are capable of independent metabolism and procreation. Although viruses have a few enzymes and molecules characteristic of living organisms, they have no metabolism of their own; they cannot synthesize and organize the organic compounds from which they are formed. Naturally, this rules out autonomous reproduction: they can only be passively replicated by the machinery of the host cell. In this sense, they are similar to inanimate matter.

While viruses sustain no independent metabolism and, thus, are usually not classified as organisms, they do have their own genes, and they do evolve by mechanisms similar to the evolutionary mechanisms of organisms. Thus, an argument that viruses should be classed as living organisms is their ability to undergo evolution and replicate through self-assembly. However, some scientists argue that viruses neither evolve nor self-reproduce. Instead, viruses are evolved by their host cells, meaning that there was co-evolution of viruses and host cells. If host cells did not exist, viral evolution would be impossible. This is not true for cells. If viruses did not exist, the direction of cellular evolution could be different, but cells would nevertheless be able to evolve. As for reproduction, viruses rely on hosts' machinery to replicate. The discovery of viruses with genes coding for energy metabolism and protein synthesis fuelled the debate about whether viruses are living organisms. The presence of these genes suggested that viruses were once able to metabolize. However, it was found later that the genes coding for energy and protein metabolism have a cellular origin. Most likely, these genes were acquired through horizontal gene transfer from viral hosts.

Chemistry
Organisms are complex chemical systems, organized in ways that promote reproduction and some measure of sustainability or survival. The same laws that govern non-living chemistry govern the chemical processes of life. It is generally the phenomena of entire organisms that determine their fitness to an environment and therefore the survival of their DNA-based genes.

Organisms clearly owe their origin, metabolism, and many other internal functions to chemical phenomena, especially the chemistry of large organic molecules. Organisms are complex systems of chemical compounds that, through interaction and environment, play a wide variety of roles.

Organisms are semi-closed chemical systems. Although they are individual units of life (as the definition requires), they are not closed to the environment around them. To operate, they constantly take in and release energy. Autotrophs produce usable energy (in the form of organic compounds) using light from the Sun or inorganic compounds, while heterotrophs take in organic compounds from the environment.

The primary chemical element in these compounds is carbon. The chemical properties of this element such as its great affinity for bonding with other small atoms, including other carbon atoms, and its small size making it capable of forming multiple bonds, make it ideal as the basis of organic life. It is able to form small three-atom compounds (such as carbon dioxide), as well as large chains of many thousands of atoms that can store data (nucleic acids), hold cells together, and transmit information (protein).

Macromolecules
Compounds that make up organisms may be divided into macromolecules and other, smaller molecules. The four groups of macromolecule are nucleic acids, proteins, carbohydrates and lipids. Nucleic acids (specifically deoxyribonucleic acid, or DNA) store genetic data as a sequence of nucleotides. The particular sequence of the four different types of nucleotides (adenine, cytosine, guanine, and thymine) dictate many characteristics that constitute the organism. The sequence is divided up into codons, each of which is a particular sequence of three nucleotides and corresponds to a particular amino acid. Thus, a sequence of DNA codes for a particular protein that, due to the chemical properties of the amino acids it is made from, folds in a particular manner and so performs a particular function.

These protein functions have been recognized:
 Enzymes, which catalyze the reactions of metabolism
 Structural proteins, such as tubulin, or collagen
 Regulatory proteins, such as transcription factors or cyclins that regulate the cell cycle
 Signaling molecules or their receptors, such as some hormones and their receptors
 Defensive proteins, which can include everything from antibodies of the immune system, to toxins (e.g., dendrotoxins of snakes), to proteins that include unusual amino acids like canavanine

A bilayer of phospholipids makes up the membrane of cells that constitutes a barrier, containing everything within a cell and preventing compounds from freely passing into, and out of, the cell. Due to the selective permeability of the phospholipid membrane, only specific compounds can pass through it.

Structure 
All organisms consist of structural units called cells; some contain a single cell (unicellular) and others contain many units (multicellular). Multicellular organisms are able to specialize cells to perform specific functions. A group of such cells is a tissue, and in animals these occur as four basic types, namely epithelium, nervous tissue, muscle tissue, and connective tissue. Several types of tissue work together in the form of an organ to produce a particular function (such as the pumping of the blood by the heart, or as a barrier to the environment as the skin). This pattern continues to a higher level with several organs functioning as an organ system such as the reproductive system, and digestive system. Many multicellular organisms consist of several organ systems, which coordinate to allow for life.

Cell

The cell theory, first developed in 1839 by Schleiden and Schwann, states that all organisms are composed of one or more cells; all cells come from preexisting cells, and cells contain the hereditary information necessary for regulating cell functions and for transmitting information to the next generation of cells.

There are two types of cells, eukaryotic and prokaryotic. Prokaryotic cells are usually singletons, while eukaryotic cells are usually found in multicellular organisms. Prokaryotic cells lack a nuclear membrane so DNA is unbound within the cell; eukaryotic cells have nuclear membranes.

All cells, whether prokaryotic or eukaryotic, have a membrane, which envelops the cell, separates its interior from its environment, regulates what moves in and out, and maintains the electric potential of the cell. Inside the membrane, a salty cytoplasm takes up most of the cell volume. All cells possess DNA, the hereditary material of genes, and RNA, containing the information necessary to build various proteins such as enzymes, the cell's primary machinery. There are also other kinds of biomolecules in cells.

All cells share several similar characteristics of:
 Reproduction by cell division (binary fission, mitosis or meiosis).
 Use of enzymes and other proteins coded by DNA genes and made via messenger RNA intermediates and ribosomes.
 Metabolism, including taking in raw materials, building cell components, converting energy, molecules and releasing by-products. The functioning of a cell depends upon its ability to extract and use chemical energy stored in organic molecules. This energy is derived from metabolic pathways.
 Response to external and internal stimuli such as changes in temperature, pH or nutrient levels.
 Cell contents are contained within a cell surface membrane that contains proteins and a lipid bilayer.

Evolutionary history

Last universal common ancestor

The last universal common ancestor (LUCA) is the most recent organism from which all organisms now living on Earth descend. Thus, it is the most recent common ancestor of all current life on Earth. The LUCA is estimated to have lived some 3.5 to 3.8 billion years ago (sometime in the Paleoarchean era). The earliest evidence for life on Earth is graphite found to be biogenic in 3.7 billion-year-old metasedimentary rocks discovered in Western Greenland and microbial mat fossils found in 3.48 billion-year-old sandstone discovered in Western Australia. Although more than 99 percent of all species that ever lived on the planet are estimated to be extinct, it is likely that more than a billion species of life exist on Earth currently, with the highest estimates and projections reaching one trillion species.

Information about the early development of life includes input from many different fields, including geology and planetary science. These sciences provide information about the history of the Earth and the changes produced by life. However, a great deal of information about the early Earth has been destroyed by geological processes over the course of time.

All organisms are descended from a common ancestor or ancestral gene pool. Evidence for common descent may be found in traits shared between all living organisms. In Darwin's day, the evidence of shared traits was based solely on visible observation of morphologic similarities, such as the fact that all birds have wings, even those that do not fly.

There is strong evidence from genetics that all organisms have a common ancestor. For example, every living cell makes use of nucleic acids as its genetic material, and uses the same twenty amino acids as the building blocks for proteins. All organisms use the same genetic code (with some extremely rare and minor deviations) to translate nucleic acid sequences into proteins. The universality of these traits strongly suggests common ancestry, because the selection of many of these traits seems arbitrary. Horizontal gene transfer makes it more difficult to study the last universal ancestor. However, the universal use of the same genetic code, same nucleotides, and same amino acids makes the existence of such an ancestor overwhelmingly likely. The first organisms were possibly anaerobic and thermophilic chemolithoautotrophis that evolved within inorganic compartments at geothermal environments.

Phylogeny

Location of the root

The most commonly accepted location of the root of the tree of life is between a monophyletic domain Bacteria and a clade formed by Archaea and Eukaryota of what is referred to as the "traditional tree of life" based on several molecular studies. A very small minority of studies have concluded differently, namely that the root is in the domain Bacteria, either in the phylum Bacillota or that the phylum Chloroflexota is basal to a clade with Archaea and Eukaryotes and the rest of Bacteria as proposed by Thomas Cavalier-Smith.

Research published in 2016, by William F. Martin, by genetically analyzing 6.1 million protein-coding genes from sequenced prokaryotic genomes of various phylogenetic trees, identified 355 protein clusters from amongst 286,514 protein clusters that were probably common to the LUCA. The results "depict LUCA as anaerobic, CO2-fixing, H2-dependent with a Wood–Ljungdahl pathway (the reductive acetyl-coenzyme A pathway), N2-fixing and thermophilic. LUCA's biochemistry was replete with FeS clusters and radical reaction mechanisms. Its cofactors reveal dependence upon transition metals, flavins, S-adenosyl methionine, coenzyme A, ferredoxin, molybdopterin, corrins and selenium. Its genetic code required nucleoside modifications and S-adenosylmethionine-dependent methylations." The results depict methanogenic clostria as a basal clade in the 355 lineages examined, and suggest that the LUCA inhabited an anaerobic hydrothermal vent setting in a geochemically active environment rich in H2, CO2, and iron. However, the identification of these genes as being present in LUCA was criticized, suggesting that many of the proteins assumed to be present in LUCA represent later horizontal gene transfers between archaea and bacteria.

Reproduction

Sexual reproduction is widespread among current eukaryotes, and was likely present in the last common ancestor. This is suggested by the finding of a core set of genes for meiosis in the descendants of lineages that diverged early from the eukaryotic evolutionary tree. and Malik et al. It is further supported by evidence that eukaryotes previously regarded as "ancient asexuals", such as Amoeba, were likely sexual in the past, and that most present day asexual amoeboid lineages likely arose recently and independently.

In prokaryotes, natural bacterial transformation involves the transfer of DNA from one bacterium to another and integration of the donor DNA into the recipient chromosome by recombination. Natural bacterial transformation is considered to be a primitive sexual process and occurs in both bacteria and archaea, although it has been studied mainly in bacteria. Transformation is clearly a bacterial adaptation and not an accidental occurrence, because it depends on numerous gene products that specifically interact with each other to enter a state of natural competence to perform this complex process. Transformation is a common mode of DNA transfer among prokaryotes.

Horizontal gene transfer

The ancestry of living organisms has traditionally been reconstructed from morphology, but is increasingly supplemented with phylogenetics – the reconstruction of phylogenies by the comparison of genetic (DNA) sequence.
Sequence comparisons suggest recent horizontal transfer of many genes among diverse species including across the boundaries of phylogenetic "domains". Thus determining the phylogenetic history of a species can not be done conclusively by determining evolutionary trees for single genes.

Biologist Peter Gogarten suggests "the original metaphor of a tree no longer fits the data from recent genome research", therefore "biologists (should) use the metaphor of a mosaic to describe the different histories combined in individual genomes and use (the) metaphor of a net to visualize the rich exchange and cooperative effects of HGT among microbes."

Future of life (cloning and synthetic organisms)
Modern biotechnology is challenging traditional concepts of organisms and species. Cloning is the process of creating a new multicellular organism, genetically identical to another, with the potential of creating entirely new species of organisms. Cloning is the subject of much ethical debate.

In 2008, the J. Craig Venter Institute assembled a synthetic bacterial genome, Mycoplasma genitalium, by using recombination in yeast of 25 overlapping DNA fragments in a single step. The use of yeast recombination greatly simplifies the assembly of large DNA molecules from both synthetic and natural fragments. Other companies, such as Synthetic Genomics, have already been formed to take advantage of the many commercial uses of custom designed genomes.

See also 
 Earliest known life forms

References

Further reading

External links 
 
  Species 2000 has the objective of enumerating all known species of plants, animals, fungi and microbes on Earth as the baseline dataset for studies of global biodiversity. It will also provide a simple access point enabling users to link from here to other data systems for all groups of organisms, using direct species-links.

 

ceb:Organismo